Uijeongbu Sports Complex is a multi-purpose stadium in Uijeongbu, South Korea.  It is currently used mostly for football matches. The Uijeongbu Stadium has a capacity of 28,000 people.

References

External links
 Uijeongbu Sports Facilities Management Center 
 World Stadiums

Football venues in South Korea
Multi-purpose stadiums in South Korea
Sports venues in Gyeonggi Province